Cychropsis sikkimensis is a species of ground beetle in the subfamily of Carabinae. It was described by Fairmaire in 1901.

References

sikkimensis
Beetles described in 1901